The Supatá golden frog (Ranitomeya sp. nov. "Supatáe") is a species of poison dart frog endemic to Colombia. It was discovered in 2007.

Description 

Etymology and habitat 
The Supatá golden frog has been named after the municipality of Supatá, homeland of the pre-Columbian Panche people. In Chibcha supatá means "low and fertile land" It is only found in a  section of the Cundinamarca Department of Colombia.

References 

Ranitomeya
Poison dart frogs
Amphibians of Colombia
Undescribed vertebrate species